Euphoberia armigera is a species of millipede that lived until the Pennsylvanian epoch 332–318 million years ago.

References

Carboniferous myriapods